Two ships of the British Royal Navy have been named HMS Jaguar, after the feline jaguar.

 The second  was a  launched in 1957 and sold to the Bangladeshi Navy in 1978, subsequently operating as BNS Ali Haider

Royal Navy ship names